Solomon James Owello (born 25 December 1988) is a Nigerian former footballer who played as a midfielder.

Career
He came to Start in 2008 from Nigerian club Niger Tornadoes F.C.

In 2016 Owello came back to Nigeria and joined Niger Tornadoes. He then joined Kwara United F.C. on 25 November 2018.

Career statistics

References

Club bio
Current season statistics from Verdens Gang

1988 births
Living people
Nigerian footballers
Niger Tornadoes F.C. players
IK Start players
Sandnes Ulf players
Norwegian First Division players
Nigerian expatriate footballers
Expatriate footballers in Norway
Nigerian expatriate sportspeople in Norway
Eliteserien players
Nigeria under-20 international footballers
Association football midfielders